The 1897 Trinity Bantams football team represented the Trinity College during the 1897 college football season. The team was led by first-year head coach Everett J. Lake. A. S. Woodle was captain.

Schedule

References

Trinity
Trinity Bantams football seasons
Trinity Bantams football